Kenji Ogusu  is a Japanese mixed martial artist.

Mixed martial arts record

|-
| Win
| align=center| 3-1-4
| Satoshi Fukuoka
| Submission (kneebar)
| Shooto - Shooto
| 
| align=center| 3
| align=center| 2:52
| Tokyo, Japan
| 
|-
| Draw
| align=center| 2-1-4
| Takeshi Miyanaga
| Draw
| Shooto - Shooto
| 
| align=center| 3
| align=center| 3:00
| Tokyo, Japan
| 
|-
| Draw
| align=center| 2-1-3
| Hiroyuki Kanno
| Draw
| Shooto - Shooto
| 
| align=center| 3
| align=center| 3:00
| Tokyo, Japan
| 
|-
| Draw
| align=center| 2-1-2
| Tadashi Murakami
| Draw
| Shooto - Shooto
| 
| align=center| 3
| align=center| 3:00
| Tokyo, Japan
| 
|-
| Win
| align=center| 2-1-1
| Yoshiaki Murai
| Decision (unanimous)
| Shooto - Shooto
| 
| align=center| 3
| align=center| 3:00
| Tokyo, Japan
| 
|-
| Draw
| align=center| 1-1-1
| Misaki Kubota
| Draw
| Shooto - Shooto
| 
| align=center| 3
| align=center| 3:00
| Tokyo, Japan
| 
|-
| Win
| align=center| 1-1
| Toshio Ando
| Decision (unanimous)
| Shooto - Shooto
| 
| align=center| 3
| align=center| 3:00
| Tokyo, Japan
| 
|-
| Loss
| align=center| 0-1
| Masato Suzuki
| Decision (unanimous)
| Shooto - Shooto
| 
| align=center| 3
| align=center| 3:00
| Tokyo, Japan
|

See also
List of male mixed martial artists

References

External links
 
 Kenji Ogusu at mixedmartialarts.com

Japanese male mixed martial artists
Mixed martial artists utilizing shootfighting
Mixed martial artists utilizing judo
Mixed martial artists utilizing Brazilian jiu-jitsu
Japanese practitioners of Brazilian jiu-jitsu
People awarded a black belt in Brazilian jiu-jitsu
Japanese male judoka
Living people
1971 births